Sea Mills may refer to:

 Sea Mills, Bristol, a district in Kingsweston, which is a ward of Bristol, England
 Sea Mills, Cornwall, a grist mill in the late 18th and early 19th centuries on the banks of Little Petherick Creek, powered by flood tidal water, now a house

See also
 Seamill, a village in North Ayrshire, Scotland
 Tide mill, a mill powered by the sea